Lavocatchampsa is an extinct genus of notosuchian mesoeucrocodylian known from the Late Cretaceous Kem Kem Beds in Morocco. It contains a single species, Lavocatchampsa sigogneaurusselae.

References 

Crocodylomorphs